Events from the 1540s in Denmark.

Incumbents
 Monarch – Christian III
 Steward of the Realm – Mogens Gøye (until 1544), Eske Bille (from 1547)

Events
1541
The  Royal Mint relocates to the forner St. Clare's Priory in Copenhagen.
 Eriksen Banner succeeds Tyge Krabbe as Marshal of the Realm.

Births
1540
 5 September – Magnus, Duke of Holstein, prince of Denmark and titular King of Livonia (died 1583 in Latvia)
1542
 9 November 1542 – Anders Sørensen Vedel, priest and historiographer (died 1616)
1543
 Anders Foss, bishop (died 1607)
1545
25 March – John II, Duke of Schleswig-Holstein-Sonderburg (died 1622)
 29 June – Dorothea of Denmark, duchess (died 1617 in Germany)
1546
 11 September 1546 – Arild Huitfeldt, historian (died 1609)
 14 December – Tycho Brahe, astronomer (died 1601)
1548
 Magnus Heinason, Faroese sailor and privateer (died 1589)

Date unknown
 Ingeborg Skeel (c. 1545), landowner and county sheriff (died 1604)

Deaths
 April 6 1544 – Mogens Gøye, statesman (born c. 1470)

References

 
Denmark
Years of the 16th century in Denmark